Dosso del Liro is a comune (municipality) in the Province of Como in the Italian region Lombardy, located about  north of Milan and about  northeast of Como, on the border with Switzerland. As of 31 December 2004, it had a population of 297 and an area of 23.2 km².

Dosso del Liro borders the following municipalities: Cama (Switzerland), Consiglio di Rumo, Gravedona, Grono (Switzerland), Livo, Peglio, Roveredo (Switzerland).

Demographic evolution

References

Cities and towns in Lombardy